Judin (also Romanized as Jūdīn) is a village in Kuh Sefid Rural District, in the Central District of Khash County, Sistan and Baluchestan Province, Iran. At the 2006 census, its population was 37, in 6 families.

References 

Sirajudin

Populated places in Khash County